Sant Esteve de Palautordera is a municipality in the comarca of the Vallès Oriental in Catalonia, Spain. It forms part of the sub-comarca of Baix Montseny.

Demography

References

 Panareda Clopés, Josep Maria; Rios Calvet, Jaume; Rabella Vives, Josep Maria (1989). Guia de Catalunya, Barcelona: Caixa de Catalunya.

External links
 Government data pages 

Municipalities in Vallès Oriental